I Love OPM (stylized as I ♥ OPM: Original Pinoy Music) is a Philippine reality music competition show on ABS-CBN network hosted by Anne Curtis and Eric Nicolas. It premiered on ABS-CBN and worldwide on The Filipino Channel on February 13, 2016 and ended on April 23, 2016 replacing Dance Kids on Pilipinas Got Talent's timeslot, it was shown on ABS-CBN every Saturdays after MMK and Sundays after Rated K.

Format and conception

100% foreigners will compete against each other in singing competition using Filipino songs and most notably the Original Pilipino Music genre. Originally conceived in 2014, the show initially had apl.de.ap as the host but had to decline after scheduling conflicts. Upon being requested as judges, Martin Nievera and Lani Misalucha agreed to participate. Singer-actress Donna Cruz was originally the third judge but the delay in production forced her to withdraw due to personal commitments. Cruz vouched for singer and friend Regine Velasquez to take her place, but since Velasquez renewed her contract with rival station GMA Network, Velasquez was unable to commit despite expressing interest to reunite with peers Nievera and Misalucha. Toni Gonzaga was tapped to be the third judge.

The contestants dubbed as "Touristars" must initially go through 2 rounds which each advancement to another round being termed as "passing a Gate". The audition phase shall determine the 24 contestants to "pass through Gate 1" or qualify to the next round. On the second round to pass Gate 2, the 24 contestants that qualified the audition phase will be group into 4 to compete against each other. Only two contestants per group can advance to the next round. The top two contestants will automatically get a chair, while the third and fourth contestants needs to Bump Off the former by surpassing the current high scores. On the third round, the contestants are grouped in to three to compete for Kababayan's Choice and Judge's Choice. After each performance, the live audience will give a Love Heart or Broken Heart to vote. The contestant with the highest Love Heart will be the Kababayan's Choice. The judges will then choose between the two remaining contestant to be the Judge's Choice.

Each gates corresponds to audition (Gate 1: The Audition), elimination round (Gate 2: The Bump Off), quarter finals (Gate 3: The Kababayan Bump Off), semi-finals (Gate 4: The Take Off), and finals (Gate 5: The Grand Destination).

Episodes
I ♥ OPM: Original Pinoy Music premiered on ABS-CBN and worldwide on The Filipino Channel on February 13, 2016 and ended on April 23, 2016 replacing Dance Kids.

Gate 1: The Audition
Each touristars must get at least 2  from Himigration Officers (Himigration is a portmanteau of the Filipino word himig which means "melody" and the word immigration) to proceed to the next round. When they get 2 , they are eliminated from the competition.

Episode 1 (February 13, 2016)
Episode hashtag: #ILoveOPM

Episode rating: 24.8%

Episode 2 (February 14, 2016)
Episode hashtag: #MahalKitaOPM

Episode rating: 20.0%

Episode 3 (February 20, 2016)
Episode hashtag: #ILoveOPMSabado

Episode rating: 23.8%

Episode 4 (February 21, 2016)
Episode hashtag: #SundayOPMvibes

Episode ratings: 17.1%

Episode 5 (February 27, 2016)
Episode hashtag: #SaturdayOPMLove

Episode rating: 18.3%

Episode 6 (February 28, 2016)
Episode hashtag: #OPMSundayWins

Episode rating: 14.7%

Episode 7 (March 5, 2016)
Episode hashtag: #ILoveOPMTop24

Episode rating: 18.3%

Gate 2: The Bump-Off
This gate is equivalent to elimination round.

The 24 Touristars will be grouped into 4 that will be competing against each other. Only two Touristars per group can pass Gate 2. The first two Touristars will automatically get a chair, while the third and fourth Touristars needs to Bump Off the former by surpassing the current high scores.

Episode 8 (March 6, 2016)
Episode hashtag: #ILOPMGate2

Destination: Davao

Activities: (1) white water rafting; (2) zip line; (3) crocodile feeding; and (4) snake massage

Episode rating: 15.7%

Episode 9 (March 12, 2016)
Episode hashtag: #ILOPMbohol

Destination: Bohol

Special Tour Guide/s: Joj Ampangan and Jai Ampangan

Activities: (1) meet-and-greet with a guitar maker; (2) Tarsier Conservation visit; (3) eat on floating restaurant; and (4) Loboc Church visit

Episode rating: 16.5%

Episode 10 (March 13, 2016)
Episode hashtag: #ILOPMmanila

Destination: Manila

Special Touristar Guide/s: Tart Carlos and Viveika Ravanes

Activities: (1) ride ferry boat; (2) eating Soup Number Five and Filipino street foods; and (3) visiting Rizal Park /Luneta Park, Chinatown, Quiapo Church and the Intramuros

Episode rating: 16.2%

Episode 11 (March 19, 2016)
Episode hashtag: #OpmCEBUtiful

Destination: Cebu

Special Touristar Guide/s: Crazy Duo

Activities: (1) whaleshark watching; (2) singing with local bangkero; and (3) habal-habal riding

Episode rating: 14.7%

Episode 12 (March 20, 2016)
Episode hashtag: #OPMBeCoolBicol

Destination: Bicol

Special Touristar Guide/s: Venus Raj

Activities: (1) preparing raft; (2) preparing and eating pinangat; (3) riding ATV; and (4) visiting Cagsawa Ruins

Episode rating: 15.7%

Episode 13 (March 27, 2016)
Episode hashtag: #OPMHappyEaster

Destination: Pampanga

Special Touristar Guide/s: Ryan Bang

Activities: (1) eating in a turo-turo; and (2) visiting the Aeta tribe

Episode rating: 15.5%

Gate 3: The Kababayan Bump-off
This gate is equivalent to quarter-final round.

The Touristars is divided into group of three. Each Himigration Officer will have a karaoke session with the three Touristars. Only two of these three will proceed to next round. The first Touristar will be chosen by 100 Kababayan (studio audience) which will give Love Heart or Broken Heart, the Kababayan's Choice. The second Touristar will be chosen by the Himigration Officers, the Judge's Choice.

Episode 14 (April 2, 2016)
Episode hashtag: #OPMletsVOTEin

Opening song: Noypi by Bamboo

Episode rating: 14.3%

Episode 15 (April 3, 2016)
Episode hashtag: #OPMiheartyou

Opening song: Ang Huling El Bimbo by Eraserheads

Episode rating: 14.8%

Episode 16 (April 9, 2016)

Episode hashtag: #OPMPowerSabado

Opening song: Bonggahan by Sampaguita

Episode rating: 12.9%

Episode 17 (April 10, 2016)

Episode hashtag: #OPMTop8

Opening song: Awitin Mo, Isasayaw Ko by VST & Company

Episode rating: 15.7%

Gate 4: The Take Off
This gate is equivalent to semi-final round.

Like the previous gate, there will be a Kababayan's Choice and Judge's Choice. There will be two Kababayan's Choice which are the ones who will receive the most number of Love Hearts from the 100 Kababayan (studio audience), including Filipino music celebrities, music composers, and music personalities like Jason Dy, Morissette Amon, Michael Pangilinan, Hazel Faith Dela Cruz, Nyoy Volante, Davey Langit and DJ Chacha. There will also be two Judge's Choice which are the ones who will get the unanimous votes from the judges. Instead of karaoke sessions with the Himigration Officers, the Touristars had a mentoring session with two guest celebrities; Erik Santos and Yeng Constantino.

Episode 18 (April 16, 2016)

Episode hashtag: #OPMTheTakeOff

Opening song: Eto Na Naman by Gary Valenciano

Celebrity Mentors: Erik Santos, and Yeng Constantino

Episode rating: 12.4%

NOTE: This is the first part of this two-part episode. The results were announced on the second part.

Episode 19 (April 17, 2016)

Episode hashtag: #OPMTop4

Celebrity Mentors: Erik Santos and Yeng Constantino

Episode rating: 18.7%

NOTE: This is a continuation on the first part of the two-part episode.

Gate 5: The Grand Destination

This gate is equivalent to final round.

The Himigration Officer will give score after each performance of the Touristars which will become the 50% of the total score. The remaining 50% will be from the public votes (Kababayan's Score). The winner as the Grand Touristar, will receive a 1-year singing contract, a vacation package and a plaque plus ₱2,000,000 (about £29,875, €37,950, US$42,850) cash.

Episode 20 (April 23, 2016)

Episode hashtag: #OPMGrandDestination

Guest performer/s: Arnel Pineda, Randy Santiago, Hajji Alejandro, James Reid

Opening song: Kay Ganda ng Ating Musika'' by Hajji Alejandro

Episode rating: 13.0%'''

Elimination summary

General  Did not perform on this episode.  Already eliminated.

Gate 1: The Auditions  Touristar gets at least 2 Approved stamp.  Touristar gets at least 2 Denied stamp.

Gate 2: The Bump-off  Highest score.  Second highest score.  Bumped-off or eliminated.

Gate 3: The Kababayan Bump-off and Gate 4: The Take Off  Kababayan's Choice.  Judge's Choice.  Bumped-off or eliminated.

Gate 5: The Grand Destination  I Love OPM Grand Touristar.  2nd Placer.  3rd Placer.  4th Placer.

See also
 List of programs broadcast by ABS-CBN

References

External links
 

ABS-CBN original programming
Philippine reality television series
2016 Philippine television series debuts
2016 Philippine television series endings
Filipino-language television shows